The International Film Music Critics Association Award for Best Original Score for an Animated Film is an annual award given by the International Film Music Critics Association, or the IFMCA. The award is given to the composer of a film score for an animated film deemed to be the best in a given year. The award was first given in 2007. Previously, animated films were grouped in with live-action films in genre categories. Animated films are still eligible for Film Score of the Year.

Winners and nominations

2000s

2010s

2020s

References

International Film Music Critics Association Awards